Al Sadu, or simply Sadu, describes an embroidery form in geometrical shapes hand-woven by Bedouin people.  Sadu House in Kuwait was established by the Al Sadu Society in 1980 to protect the interests of the Bedouins and Sadu weaving.  

In 2011 Al Sadu traditional weaving skills in the United Arab Emirates was inscribed in the UNESCO List of Intangible Cultural Heritage in Need of Urgent Safeguarding, and in 2020 traditional weaving of Al Sadu in Saudi Arabia and Kuwait was inscribed on the list.

The nature of Al Sadu
Al Sadu is said to be an ancient tribal weaving craft that artistically portrays Arabian nomadic peoples’ rich cultural heritage and instinctive expression of natural beauty. Woven geometric and figurative patterns and symbols reflect the traditional tribal lifestyle, the desert environment and the weavers’ creative self-expression. The textiles and weaving practice can be seen as an extension of the weaver's hand, and the graceful moving pace of the camel. Camels were used for transportation and food, but also for textile production, and so their figurative symbolism is important. Camel symbols and tribal animal brandings can create a complex visual code depicted in highly prized woven Sadu textiles.  With the demise of tribal existence and the decline of associated weaving skills and memories, the demands for tribal camel textiles have virtually ceased, and so Al Sadu weaving and nomadic animal husbandry, once crucial and vital, is in decline.

Al Sadu in Kuwait
There are two main settings for Al Sadu in Kuwait: the desert, the traditional home of the nomadic Bedouin, where weaving was carried out by women; and the settled, urban existence of the town, where a very different type of weaving was undertaken by men. The history of wool weaving in the Arabian desert goes back thousands of years with woven items such as the tent and its colorful dividers, storage bags and animal trappings. In the urban setting of the town, men took on the weaving of cloth for the bisht (a man's cloak).

The Al Sadu Society of Kuwait is dedicated to preserving, documenting and promoting the rich and diverse textile heritage of the Kuwaiti Bedouin, from the nomadic weaving of the desert through to the urban weaving of the town. Begun in 1978, as a private initiative, by a group of concerned Kuwaitis who wished to preserve a fast disappearing, yet intrinsic, cultural identity, the Al Sadu Project was founded. In 1991, soon after the Liberation of Kuwait, the project was transformed into Al Sadu Weaving Co-operative Society, a venture owned and run by the weavers and artisans themselves. The society runs a gallery, museum, shop and workshop at Sadu House (Beit al Sadu).

In 2020 at the Session of the UNESCO Intergovernmental Committee for the Safeguarding of the Intangible Cultural Heritage, Al Sadu in the Kuwait was inscribed on the List of Intangible Cultural Heritage in Need of Urgent Safeguarding.

Al Sadu in the United Arab Emirates
Al Sadu in the United Arab Emirates is a traditional form of weaving practised by Bedouin women in rural communities. Traditionally men shear goats and camels, and the wool is cleaned and prepared by the women. The yarn is spun on a drop spindle, then dyed using local plant extracts (such as henna or saffron), and then woven on a floor loom using a warp-faced plain weave. The traditional colours are black, white, brown, beige and red, with distinctive patterns in the form of narrow bands of geometric designs. The result is colourful products: clothing, camel and horse decorations, Bedouin tents, majlis floor pillows, carpets and mats. Traditionally, women gather in small groups to spin and weave, exchanging family news and occasionally chanting and reciting poetry. Such gatherings are also the means of transmitting the tradition: girls learn by watching, and are gradually given tasks to do, such as sorting the wool, before learning the more intricate skills involved.

In 2011 at the Sixth Session of the UNESCO Intergovernmental Committee for the Safeguarding of the Intangible Cultural Heritage, Al Sadu in the United Arab Emirates was inscribed on the List of Intangible Cultural Heritage in Need of Urgent Safeguarding.

Al Sadu in Qatar 
Sadu weaving in Qatar like their neighbouring countries is an ancient form of weaving practiced by nomadic women. Traditionally, nomadic people obtained most of the raw materials from their flocks: fibres were made of sheep wool or camel or goat hair. The short fibres were combed and teased, before spinning them to create a continuous yarn. Women of all ages could often be found spinning throughout the day, as they carried out other daily activities, such as herding, or cooking. Al-Sadu weaving is distinguished by its technique, in which long and narrow strips of cloth, sometimes up to 7 metres, are woven individually on a horizontal ground loom. The bands are then sewn together to create a large canvas. It was common for these designs to reflect the desert environment. Symbols represented the stars, meteorological phenomena, or sand dunes, desert plants or animals. Weavers also depicted the jewellery and face decorations that women of the tribe wore to represent not only their beauty, but also the tribe’s wealth.

In 2021, Embrace Doha an independent cultural house located in Souq Al Wakrah curated two private galleries dedicated to telling the story of Sadu from the prospective of the last few local Sadu weavers left in the country. The aim of their work is to bring attention to the urgency of safeguarding the intangible heritage of Sadu weaving to ensure the continuity and preservation efforts for the wider community.

See also
 Bibi Duaij Al-Jaber Al-Sabah
Haifa al-Mogrin

Notable people

Masterpieces of the Oral and Intangible Heritage of Humanity
Weaving
Emirati culture
Kuwaiti culture